Ploumanac'h ( or [plumana], and in Breton [pluˈmãːnax]) is a village port in a natural harbour, part of the commune of Perros-Guirec, in the arrondissement of Lannion, in the Côtes-d'Armor department of the Brittany region of France. In 2015 it was voted "the village most preferred by the French". It lies 3 kilometres north-west of the town Perros-Guirec.

An outstanding feature of the area is the pink granite rock and sands of the Côte de Granit Rose coast. Buildings of interest are the tidal mill and the Ploumanac'h Lighthouse. The chapel of Saint Guirec faces the beach, opposite its little 12th-century oratory which is surrounded by the sea at high tide. The small chateau is not open to the public but it was the place where Henryk Sienkiewicz wrote Quo Vadis and gained himself a Nobel Prize in Literature.

Climate

References

External links 
 The Oratory at Ploumanac'h 

Geography of Côtes-d'Armor